Martin Leonard Newell (born 1939 in Galway, Ireland) is a retired Irish mathematician and sportsman.

He earned his BSc and MSc in mathematical science at University College Galway before pursuing his PhD at Goethe University Frankfurt.  He taught at Queen Mary College, in London, for three years, before returning to lecture at UCG (1969-2005).  He has co-edited two conference proceedings on group theory: Infinite Groups 1994 (Walter de Gruyter, 1994) and Advances in Group Theory 2002 (Aracne, 2003).

Martin L. Newell is the son of mathematician Martin J. Newell, and is in turn the father of mathematician John Newell.

Football career
He played at left-half-back on the winning Galway teams in the All-Ireland Senior Football Championship finals of 1964, 1965 and 1966.

References

External links
 

1939 births
Living people
Alumni of the University of Galway
Goethe University Frankfurt alumni
Academics of Queen Mary University of London
Academics of the University of Galway
Fr. Griffin's Gaelic footballers
Galway inter-county Gaelic footballers
Connacht inter-provincial Gaelic footballers